, known as the Yanmar Stadium Nagai for sponsorship reasons, is a stadium in Osaka, Japan. It is the home ground of J. League club Cerezo Osaka. The stadium has a seating capacity of 47,000.

History
When Nagai Stadium initially opened in 1964, its capacity was 23,000, and its opening event was a football match during the 1964 Summer Olympics. The stadium's seating capacity was expanded to 50,000 in 1996 for the 52nd National Sports Festival of Japan in 1997.

The stadium hosted three matches in the 2002 FIFA World Cup.
 

Nagai Stadium has been used many times for athletic competitions; it played host to the Athletics at the 2001 East Asian Games and the 2007 World Championships in Athletics. It is also the venue for the annual Osaka Grand Prix athletics meeting which took place every May from 1996 to 2010, and again since 2018. In addition, the stadium is the starting and finishing point for the Osaka International Ladies Marathon, held annually in late January-early February.

Access

Rail transit
It takes 3 minutes on foot from Tsurugaoka Station on JR-West Hanwa Line.
It takes 5 minutes on foot from Nagai Station on JR-West Hanwa Line and Osaka Municipal Subway Midōsuji Line.
It takes 20 minutes on foot from Harinakano Station on Kintetsu Minami Osaka Line.

Osaka City Bus
Subway Nagai
Route 4: Subway Suminoekoen – Subway Nagai – Deto Bus Terminal
Route 24: Sumiyoshi Shako-mae – Subway Nagai – Minami-Nagai
Route 40: Sumiyoshi Shako-mae – Subway Nagai – Deto Bus Terminal

Nagaikoen-kitaguchi
Route 54A: Sumiyoshi Shako-mae → Subway Abiko → Takaai Danchi-mae → Nagaikoen-kitaguchi → Subway Nishitanabe → Furitsu Sogo-iryo-center (General Medical Center) → Sumiyoshi Shako-mae
Route 54B: Sumiyoshi Shako-mae → Furitsu Sogo-iryo-center (General Medical Center) → Subway Nishitanabe → Nagaikoen-kitaguchi → Takaai Danchi-mae → Subway Abiko → Sumiyoshi Shako-mae

See also
 Nagai Aid Stadium
 Nagai Ball Gall Field

References

FIFA.com 1964 Summer Olympics JPN-YUG results from the stadium. - accessed 14 August 2010.

External links

 Official site 

 

Athletics (track and field) venues in Japan
2002 FIFA World Cup stadiums in Japan
Football venues in Japan
Rugby union stadiums in Japan
Sports venues in Osaka
Higashisumiyoshi-ku, Osaka
2007 World Championships in Athletics
College football venues
Venues of the 1964 Summer Olympics
Olympic football venues
Cerezo Osaka
American football venues in Japan
1964 establishments in Japan
Sports venues completed in 1964